Sir Colin Campbell Garbett  (22 May 1881 – 10 August 1972) was a British civil servant who worked in the colonial service in India and Iraq. He translated some Persian works including some poems of Jalaluddin Rumi.

Early life 

Garbett was born on 22 May 1881 in Dalhousie, India, the second son of Hubert Garbett. He was sent to school at King William's College on the Isle of Man.

Career 
Garbett joined the Indian Civil Service in 1905 and was initially posted to Mandi State in 1910. He became a District Judge at Simla in 1913 and then served as a postal censor in Karachi and Bombay (1915-16) before becoming a Chief Political Officer in 1916 with the Mesopotamian Expeditionary Force. He became an assistant secretary at the India Office in 1919. In 1920 he became Political Secretary to the High Commissioner and Commander-in-Chief for Iraq.

On 9 December 1920 the Bristol Fighter in which he was travelling to Kirkuk overturned on landing at Tauq, killing the pilot. Garbett survived with a broken arm.

In 1943, he wrote a book Friend of Friend based on clashes between Hindus and Muslims in the Punjab. Garbett translated some poems of Rumi as Sun of Tabriz (1956) with illustrations by Sylvia Baxter. He was deeply interested in the spiritual teachings of Baba Sawan Singh and took an interest in Surat Shabd Yoga. He also wrote on the teachings of the sect in The Ringing Radiance (1967).

Honours 

Garbett was made a Companion of the Order of the Indian Empire (CIE) in 1918 "in recognition of meritorious services rendered in connection with military operations in Mesopotamia." He was made a Companion of the Order of St Michael and St George (CMG) in the 1922 Birthday Honours, and a Companion of the Order of the Star of India (CSI) in the 1935 Birthday Honours. 

In June 1938, for his work during the Quetta Earthquake of 1935, he was appointed an Officer of the Order of St. John (OStJ). He was elevated within the Order of the Indian Empire and made a Knight Commander (KCIE) in the 1941 Birthday Honours. He was also mentioned in dispatches on three occasions.

Personal life 

Garbett married twice; his first wife died, and on 20 January 1919 he married Marjorie Maynard, ten years his junior, in the Bengal Presidency. They had at least one child, daughter, Susan. The couple were later estranged.

In 1913, he was listed a member of The Folklore Society. From 1919, he was a Fellow of the Royal Geographical Society.

He retired in 1950 and settled in South Africa. A freemason, he was an honorary member of Melrose Lodge in Johannesburg from 1957. He died on 10 August 1972 and was cremated.

Posthumous
In the 1970s, probably following clearance of his wife's house after her death, an urn containing his ashes was found at a recycling centre in Surrey, discarded in a waste skip. They were subsequently returned to the family when the undertaker who had handled the funeral of his daughter Susan in 2004 saw a newspaper story about them, and were then interred at a London crematorium alongside those of Susan.

Notes

References 

British civil servants
1881 births
1972 deaths
Companions of the Order of the Indian Empire
Companions of the Order of St Michael and St George
Knights Commander of the Order of the Indian Empire
Order of Saint John (chartered 1888)
British people in colonial India
British expatriates in Iraq
People educated at King William's College
Translators from Persian
British expatriates in South Africa
Fellows of the Royal Geographical Society
British Freemasons